Celtic Themes: The Very Best of Clannad is a greatest hits compilation album by Irish group Clannad. It was released to coincide with their reunion UK tour in early 2008.

Track listing 
"Theme from Harry's Game"
"I Will Find You"
"Robin (The Hooded Man)"
"In a Lifetime"
"Caislean Óir"
"Something to Believe In"
"A Bridge (That Carries Us Over)"
"Mystery Game"
"Almost Seems (Too Late to Turn)"
"Closer to Your Heart"
"Newgrange"
"Rí Na Cruinne"
"The Hunter"
"Together We"
"Seanchas"
"Coinleach Glas An Fhómhair"
"A Mhuirnin Ó"
"Saltwater" (with Chicane)

Charts

References

External links 
 Celtic Themes TV Commercial

2008 greatest hits albums
Clannad compilation albums